Alexander Pechtold (born 16 December 1965) is a retired Dutch politician and art historian. He is a member of Democrats 66.

Pechtold studied Archaeology and History of Dutch Art at Leiden University, and obtained a Master of Arts degree. Pechtold worked as an auctioneer in The Hague from July 1992 until June 1996 and as an Alderman in Leiden from June 1996 until October 2003. Pechtold served as Chairman of the Democrats 66 from 16 November 2002 until 31 March 2005. In September 2003 Pechtold was nominated as the next Mayor of Wageningen taking office on 1 October 2003. Pechtold was appointed as Minister without Portfolio for the Interior in the Cabinet Balkenende II following a cabinet reshuffle taking office on 31 March 2005. After Party Leader Boris Dittrich announced he was stepping down, Pechtold announced his candidacy and was elected as his successor on 24 June 2006. The Cabinet fell just a year later, and he resigned on 3 July 2006.

For the election of 2006 Pechtold served as Lijsttrekker (top candidate) and was elected as a Member of the House of Representatives and became Parliamentary leader on 30 November 2006. For the elections of 2010, 2012 and 2017 Pechtold served again as Lijsttrekker and following a successful cabinet formation in 2017 with the Conservative-Liberals and the Christian-Democrats formed the Cabinet Rutte III with Pechtold opting to remain as Parliamentary leader. In October 2018 Pechtold unexpectedly announced his retirement from national politics and stepped down as Leader and Parliamentary leader on 10 October 2018.

Early life
Alexander Pechtold was born on 16 December 1965 in Delft in the Dutch province of South Holland. Pechtold and his elder brother Roland Pechtold grew up in the village of Rhoon. He went to a Lyceum in Rotterdam. Pechtold studied art history and archaeology with a specialization in 17th-century painting at Leiden University, obtaining a Bachelor of Arts and a Master of Arts degree in 1996. During that time Pechtold obtained certification as an auctioneer, and worked for the Van Stockum's Veilingen during his studies.

Politics

Party chair
Pechtold became a member of the Democrats 66 (D66) party in 1989. He was elected as a Municipal councillor in Leiden in 1994, and became an alderman in 1996. On 16 November 2002 he was elected as Chairman of the D66. Pechtold was tasked with reforming the party after its disastrous results in the general election of 2002, and preparing for the upcoming election of 2003.

Mayor of Wageningen
On 1 October 2003, Pechtold was appointed Mayor of Wageningen; he remained Chairman of the D66.

Minister for Government Reform and Kingdom Relations
Thom de Graaf, the D66 Deputy Prime Minister and Minister for Government Reform and Kingdom Relations in the Second Balkenende cabinet, resigned on 23 March 2005 after the introduction of democratically elected mayors had been rejected in the Senate. The proposal was especially important; it had become a symbol of the government reform that the D66 had wanted since the party's creation. Pechtold was asked to succeed him as Minister. Pechtold resigned as Chairman and Mayor the same day that he took office as the new Minister for  Government Reform and Kingdom Relations, on 31 March 2005.

On 29 June 2006 the D66 retracted its support for the Second Balkenende cabinet. The next day, Prime Minister Jan Peter Balkenende offered the resignation of the full cabinet to Queen Beatrix. Pechtold resigned as Minister for Government Reform and Kingdom Relations on 3 July 2006. His fellow D66 cabinet member Laurens Jan Brinkhorst, the Deputy Prime Minister and Minister of Economic Affairs, resigned on 7 July 2006.

House of Representatives
Pechtold was elected the Leader of the D66 on 24 June 2006 in the leadership election of 2006, defeating Lousewies van der Laan, the party's Parliamentary leader in the House of Representatives. Van der Laan had only a few months earlier succeeded Boris Dittrich, who had resigned as party leader and parliamentary leader in the House of Representatives on 3 February 2006.

In 2007 the parliamentarian press chose Pechtold with 31% of the votes as the "Dutch politician of the year 2007".

For the Dutch general election of 2006 Pechtold became lijsttrekker (top candidate) and the Democrats 66 lost three seats and became an opposition party. For the Dutch general election of 2010, Pechtold again as Lijsttrekker won ten seats but the Democrats 66 remained an opposition party. With the following Dutch general election of 2012, Pechtold again as lijsttrekker won two seats with the Democrats 66 again remaining an opposition party.

During the Fourth Balkenende cabinet administration Pechtold served as government opposition leader. After the Dutch elections of 2010, the D66 won seven-seats in the House of Representatives which journalists claimed was due to Pechtolds leadership during the Fourth Balkenende cabinet time. After the 2010 Dutch cabinet formation the D66 again remained in opposition. In 2012, Pechtold published Henk, Ingrid, & Alexander, which ostensibly aimed to break through the populism that has dominated Dutch politics in the previous decade, "Henk" and "Ingrid" being the generic names proposed by Geert Wilders and other Party for Freedom politicians to represent the average Dutch couple, by engaging everyday people in conversation. The book was panned in de Volkskrant as a "cheap PR-stunt without any value to it."

During a debate with Mark Rutte in 2010, Pechtold championed the cause of social liberalism, noting that the government “needs to offer services where fairness is more important than efficiency, such as education and healthcare," while accusing Rutte of pursuing policies that hurt the most vulnerable in Dutch society.

After the shootdown of Malaysia Airlines Flight 17 in July 2014, Pechtold explicitly voiced his support for economic expediency over ethical correctness by stating: "We are a small country, dependent on our exports, and unlike the United States, we cannot always react from our moral high grounds."

In December 2017, it was revealed that Pechtold received an apartment valued at 135,000 euros from Serge Marcoux, a former Canadian ambassador, that was not listed on the gift register of the House of Representatives, with Pechtold justifying the lack of report by saying that he knew Marcoux from outside politics and that the apartment was a private gift which did not fall under the purview of the register.

On October 6, 2018, Pechtold announced his resignation as D66 leader and from the parliament. As chairman of the parliamentary party, Pechtold was succeeded by Rob Jetten on 9 October.

Post-politics
Pechtold retired from active politics at just 52 and became active in the public sector as a non-profit director and serves on several state commissions and councils on behalf of the government.

References

External links

Official
  Drs. A. (Alexander) Pechtold Parlement & Politiek

 

1965 births
Living people
Aldermen of Leiden
Chairmen of the Democrats 66
Democrats 66 politicians
Dutch auctioneers
Dutch agnostics
Art collectors from The Hague
Dutch art historians
Leaders of the Democrats 66
Leiden University alumni
Mayors of Wageningen
Members of the House of Representatives (Netherlands)
Ministers of Kingdom Relations of the Netherlands
Ministers without portfolio of the Netherlands
Municipal councillors of Leiden
People from Albrandswaard
People from Delft
People from Wageningen
Scholars of Dutch art
Scholars of Netherlandish art
20th-century Dutch historians
20th-century Dutch politicians
21st-century Dutch civil servants
21st-century Dutch historians
21st-century Dutch politicians